Dobase is a Cushitic language spoken in the Dirashe special woreda of the Southern Nations, Nationalities, and People's Region located in southern Ethiopia. When Blench (2006) reclassified Bussa from the Dullay to the Konsoid branch of Cushitic, he left the erstwhile Mashole, Lohu, and Dobase (D'oopace, D'opaasunte) dialects behind as the Dobase language.

References

Languages of Ethiopia
East Cushitic languages
Endangered languages of Africa